Mitsuoka Motors is a Japanese automobile manufacturer.

Mitsuoka may also refer to:

People 
 Mitsuoka (surname)

Mitsuoka Motors cars 
 Mitsuoka Galue, a name used on two series of cars by Mitsuoka
 Mitsuoka Himiko, a sports car by Mitsuoka
 Mitsuoka Like, a four-door car by Mitsuoka
 Mitsuoka Nouera, a four-door saloon car by Mitsuoka
 Mitsuoka Orochi, a sports car by Mitsuoka
 Mitsuoka Viewt, a car, modified from the Nissan March/Micra, intended to resemble the Jaguar Mark 2

Other uses 
 Mitsuoka Station, a railway station on the Koumi Line in the city of Komoro, Nagano Prefecture, Japan